The Jack Dempsey (Rocio octofasciata)  is a species of cichlid fish that is native to freshwater habitats from southern Mexico to Honduras, but also introduced elsewhere. Its common name refers to its aggressive nature and strong facial features, likened to that of the famous 1920s boxer Jack Dempsey.

Distribution
The fish is native to freshwater habitats from southern Mexico to Honduras, where it is found in slow-moving waters, such as swampy areas with warm, murky water, weedy, mud- and sand-bottomed canals, drainage ditches, and rivers. It is also established as an introduced species in Australia, the United States and Thailand (presumably as an aquarium escapee) These are locally known as the Mexican Blue Frontosa.

Ecology
Males can reach up to 10in length. It is carnivorous, eating worms, crustaceans, insects and other fish.

Reproduction
Jack Dempseys lay their eggs on a flat hard surface within their territory, such as rocks, logs, or the glass bottom of an aquarium. Like most cichlids, they show substantial parental care: both parents help incubate the eggs and guard the fry when they hatch. Jack Dempseys are known to be attentive parents, pre-chewing food to feed to their offspring. However, it is not uncommon for them to eat their fry when the breeding pair are overly disturbed or something in their environment is wrong.

Morphology
The coloration changes as the fish matures from a light gray or tan with faint turquoise flecks to a dark purple-gray with very bright, iridescent blue, green, and gold flecks. Their colors change under stress. The dorsal and anal fins of mature males have long, pointed tips. Females lack these exaggerated tips. During breeding both genders considerably darken in color, appearing almost black with little to no metallic coloration.

Different variations of color are also available on the aquarium market. Color variants include Gold, Electric Blue, and pink (a fish that displays both gold & blue traits)

In the aquarium
The fish is a popular aquarium fish, due to its striking appearance and personable mannerisms. It, like most cichlids, is considered "aggressive", but can get along in a well-populated tank, tending to be more territorial if kept with only a few other fish, therefore allowed to easily establish and defend a "territory" in the tank. Jack Dempsey cichlids can often appear shy, hiding away in cave work. It is recommended that the Jack Dempsey cichlid is provided with plenty of places to hide. They will often claim a cave first and be very aggressive to other tank mates that swim near its home. 
There is also a blue variant of this fish which commonly known as the blue Jack Dempsey or electric blue Jack Dempsey. This is natural genetic mutation. The blue counterpart is less aggressive, smaller in size and more delicate.

See also
 List of freshwater aquarium fish species

References

Heroini
Fish described in 1903